is a Japanese actor and voice actor from Nobeoka, Miyazaki. He is attached to Aoni Production, Nichine Promotion, Soeta Office and Horipro. He is married to actress Honoka Suzuki.

Roles

Stage
Barefoot Gen (Father)
Everyone Says I Love You (Charles Ferry)
Gentlemen Prefer Blondes (Henry Spofford)
The Glass Menagerie (Tom Wingfield)
Gone with the Wind (Charles Hamilton)
The King and I (Lun Tha)
Les Misérables (Marius Pontmercy (1987–1988), Thénardier (2007–2009))
Miss Saigon (Chris)
My Fair Lady (Harry)
Promises, Promises (J.D. Sheldrake)
Saturday Night Fever (Frank Junior)
Twelfth Night (Sir Toby Belch)
The Umbrellas of Cherbourg (Monsieur Dubourg)

Television drama
Hanshichi Torimonochō
Koi
Sensei no Okiniiri!

Television animation
Yu-Gi-Oh! Duel Monsters (Marik's father)

Dubbing roles

Live-action
Cradle Will Rock (Canada Lee (Chris McKinney))

Animation
All Dogs Go to Heaven 2 (Charlie B. Barkin)
Ice Age (Lenny)
Moana (Tui)
Pocahontas II: Journey to a New World (John Rolfe)
The Powerpuff Girls (Professor Utonium)
The Powerpuff Girls Movie (Professor Utonium)
The Princess and the Frog (Doctor Facilier)

Other roles
Cartoon Network commercial spots (Professor Utonium)

References

External links
Official site
Official weblog
Horipro profile

1960 births
Living people
Japanese male film actors
Japanese male television actors
Japanese male voice actors
Male voice actors from Miyazaki Prefecture